General Archer may refer to:

James J. Archer (1817–1864), Confederate States Army brigadier general
John Archer (British Army officer) (1924–1999), British Army general

See also
Attorney General Archer (disambiguation)